Darwinia speciosa is a plant in the myrtle family Myrtaceae and is endemic to the southwest of Western Australia. It is a dwarf, spreading or prostrate shrub with narrowly oblong leaves arranged in opposite pairs, and greenish flowers surrounded by larger dark red or brownish involucral bracts.

Description
Flowering mainly occurs from July to November.

Taxonomy
This species was first formally described in 1857 by Carl Meissner who gave it the name Genetyllis speciosa in the Journal of the Proceedings of the Linnean Society, Botany from material collected near the Hill River by James Drummond. In 1865, George Bentham changed the name to Darwinia speciosa in a later edition of the same journal. The specific epithet (speciosa) means "showy".

Distribution and habitat
Darwinia speciosa mainly grows in sandy kwongan in the Avon Wheatbelt, Geraldton Sandplains and Swan Coastal Plain bioregions of south-western Western Australia.

References

 

speciosa
Endemic flora of Western Australia
Myrtales of Australia
Rosids of Western Australia
Plants described in 1865